Ruth Cleveland (October 3, 1891 – January 7, 1904), popularly known as Baby Ruth, was the eldest of five children born to United States President Grover Cleveland and First Lady Frances Cleveland. Her birth between Cleveland's two terms of office caused a national sensation. Interest in her continued even after her father's second presidential term was over. A sickly child, Ruth Cleveland contracted diphtheria on January 2, 1904. Doctors thought her case was mild, but she died five days after her diagnosis. She is buried in Princeton Cemetery.

In popular culture
The Curtiss Candy Company asserted that the "Baby Ruth" candy bar (formerly known as Kandy Kake from 1900–1920) was named after Ruth Cleveland. The renaming of the candy bar took place in 1921, thirty years after Ruth Cleveland's birth and seventeen years after her death. That same year, legendary baseball player George Herman Ruth, better known by the nickname Babe Ruth, was nearing the top of his popularity, having just broken the single-season home run record.

As Richard Sandomir of The New York Times pointed out, "For 85 years, Babe Ruth, the slugger, and Baby Ruth, the candy bar, have lived parallel lives in which it has been widely assumed that the latter was named for the former. The confection's creator, the Curtiss Candy Company, never admitted to what looks like an obvious connection – especially since Ruth hit 54 home runs the year before the first Baby Ruth was devoured. Had it done so, Curtiss would have had to compensate Ruth. Instead, it eventually insisted the inspiration was "Baby Ruth" Cleveland, the daughter of President Grover Cleveland. But it is an odd connection that makes one wonder at the marketing savvy of Otto Schnering, the company's founder."

See also
 List of children of presidents of the United States

References

External links

1891 births
1904 deaths
19th-century American women
20th-century American women
Children of presidents of the United States
Cornell family
Grover Cleveland family
Respiratory disease deaths in New Jersey
Infectious disease deaths in New Jersey
Deaths from diphtheria
Burials at Princeton Cemetery
Princeton Day School alumni

Child deaths